Fergus, a novel by Northern Irish-Canadian writer Brian Moore, was published in 1970, in the United States by Holt, Rinehart and Winston.
It tells the story of Fergus Fadden, a 39-year-old Irish-born writer living in California, who is haunted by ghosts from his past, including that of his father.

Moore's biographer, Patricia Craig, described it as "wholly original, and singularly diverting". Jo O'Donoghue says that, in Fergus, "Moore carries the theme of family influence to an extreme conclusion". George Woodcock, reviewing the novel for the quarterly journal Canadian Literature, said: "Fergus's nightmare is never less than convincing. The novel that bears his name is a masterpiece of the best kind of fantasy".

Quote
"Until now, he had thought that, like everyone else, he exorcised his past by living it. But he was not like everyone else. His past had risen up this morning, vivid, uncontrollable, shouldering into his present."

(Fergus, Holt, Rinehart and Winston, p. 37)

References

1970 British novels
1970 Canadian novels
Ghosts in written fiction
Novels about writers
Novels by Brian Moore (novelist)
Novels set in Los Angeles County, California
Holt, Rinehart and Winston books